Seventeen is a 2019 Spanish comedy-drama film directed by Daniel Sánchez Arévalo, written by Daniel Sánchez Arévalo and Araceli Sánchez and starring  and Nacho Sánchez. It also features Itsaso Arana and Kandido Uranga.

The film had its world premiere at the San Sebastián International Film Festival on September 27, 2019 and was released theatrically in Spain on October 4, 2019, before digital streaming on October 18, 2019, by Netflix.

Plot summary

The plot revolves around 17-year-old Héctor who runs away from the youth detention center he's been at for the last two years to locate the dog Oveja that Héctor met on an animal rescue center. Héctor is accompanied by his older brother Ismael, who wants to make sure Héctor doesn't get into trouble.

Cast

Release
Seventeen had its premiere at the San Sebastián International Film Festival on September 27, 2019. It was released in selected cinemas in Spain on October 4, 2019. It was released by digital streaming on October 18, 2019, by Netflix.

See also 
 List of Spanish films of 2019

References

External links
 
 

2019 films
2019 comedy-drama films
2010s road movies
2010s Spanish films
2010s Spanish-language films
Spanish comedy-drama films
Spanish road movies
Spanish-language Netflix original films
Atípica Films films